was a Japanese classical composer.

Biography
Takekuni Hirayoshi graduated from Tokyo University of the Arts Department of Music in 1961 and completed his graduate work there in 1967.  He studied with Yoshio Hasegawa (長谷川良夫) and Yoshiho Ikuma (伊熊良穂).  He was the 1969 recipient of the Otaka Award (尾高賞).  Subsequently, he was a part-time lecturer at Tokyo University of the Arts, and professor at Toho Gakuen School of Music and Okinawa Prefectural University of Arts.

The compositions of Hirayoshi encompass many genres, among which his many popular choral works are notable.  In his later years, he focused on piano music for children.

Selected works 
The compositions of Takekuni Hirayoshi are published mainly by the Japan Federation of Composers, Ongaku-no-Tomo Sha and Edition Kawai.

Orchestral
 Composition (コンポジション) for orchestra 
 Ballade (バラード) for orchestra
 Epitaph (エピタフ) for string orchestra (1971)
 Symphonic Variations (交響変奏曲)
 Umi no aru fūkei (海のある風景)

Band
 Composition for symphonic band (シンフォニックバンドのためのコンポジション)
 Rhapsody for symphonic band (シンフォニック・バンドのためのラプソディ)
 High School Festival Prelude (高校祝典序曲) (1978); commissioned for the 70th anniversary of Hyōgo High School

Concertante
 Requiem (レクイエム) for violin and orchestra
 Concerto (ギター協奏曲) for guitar and orchestra (1980)

 Chamber music
 Impromptu for Three Players for flute, violin and piano (1970)
 Preludio e fantasia for guitar (1970)
 Kaze no Uta (風の歌 Song of the Wind) for 2 marimbas (1973)
 Samba Canción (サンバ・カンシオン) for clarinet and Piano    
 Hoshi tachi no utage ni (星たちの宴に Stars Party) for string quintet

Piano
 Kānibaru ga yatte kita (カーニバルがやってきた The Carnival Has Come)
 Elegy (エレジー) (1997)
 Habanera (ハバネラ)
 Niji no rizumu (虹のリズム Rainbow Rhythm) (1979); collection of compositions for children
 Minami no kaze (南の風 South Wind); collection of compositions for children
 Haru ni nattara (春になったら When Spring Comes...)

Vocal
 Aozora ni noborou (青空に登ろう); nursery song
 Hatsukoi (初恋 First Love) for baritone, violin and piano 4-hands
 Hitotsu no asa (ひとつの朝 One Morning) for chorus
 Kikyū ni notte dokomade mo (気球にのってどこまでも) for children's chorus
 Ōkina yume no māchi (大きな夢のマーチ); nursery song
 Sasurai no funaji (さすらいの船路), Suite for male chorus (published 1994)
 Shiokaze no samba (潮風のサンバ) for chorus
 Sora ni kotori ga inaku natta hi (空に小鳥がいなくなった日) for mixed chorus and piano
 Umi no fushigi (海の不思議) for chorus
 Wakai tsubasa wa (若い翼は) for chorus
 Yume (夢 Dream), Sketch for mixed chorus and piano

 Film scores
 Hans Christian Andersen's The Little Mermaid (1975)

External links 

The Resource Center for Japanese Music

References

1936 births
1998 deaths
20th-century classical composers
20th-century Japanese male musicians
Academic staff of Toho Gakuen School of Music
Japanese classical composers
Japanese male classical composers
Musicians from Kobe
Tokyo University of the Arts alumni